Kitakami may refer to:
 Kitakami, Iwate, a city in Iwate Prefecture, Japan
 Kitakami Station, a JR train station in Kitakami
 Kitakami Line, a JR railway line in Iwate Prefecture, Japan
 Kitakami Stadium, an athletic stadium in Kitakami
 Kitakami River, a river that flows through Iwate and Miyagi Prefectures in Japan
 Kitakami Mountains
 Japanese cruiser Kitakami, a former cruiser in the Imperial Japanese Navy